Pride is a 2004 television comedy-drama film about two lion cubs as they grow up and face the harsh realities of adulthood. Produced by the BBC and shown on A&E in the U.S., the film features the voices of numerous British actors and uses  CGI technology to enhance footage of actual lions and other animals. Jim Henson's Creature Shop provided the digital effects and animatronics for the film. It was shot in Tanzania's Serengeti National Park.

Plot 
Suki, her cowardly brother Linus, and their conceited cousin Fleck are all lion cubs. When two rogue lions called Dark and Harry known as "The Wanderers" attack and while the lionesses help, they kill Fleck's mother leaving him an orphan. Suki and Linus decide to go exploring and find out how the Wanderers got across the river. Their mother Macheeba thought it impossible for the Wanderers to get across as there are  Nile crocodiles in the river. Suki and Linus find a dead tree making a bridge, which is probably how the Wanderers got across. Elephants destroy the bridge leaving the cubs (and the Wanderers) trapped. When they meet Dark, he saves them from a pack of  spotted hyenas, and Suki develops a crush on him. She and Linus have no choice but to swim across the river, and they successfully do.

As the cubs become teenagers, Suki and Linus are being taught to hunt. Suki does not want to hunt and becomes a vegetarian. Fleck thinks that Suki and Linus do not like him because he is an orphan. Often in the film, Linus tries to practice hunting but is humiliated twice (being urinated on by an olive baboon, and trying to hunt a banded mongoose, but is chased up a tree by a herd of cape buffalo). When Suki, Fleck and Linus are adults, Suki refuses to hunt/contribute to the pride as she sees it as cruelty to kill animals, therefore rendering her useless or another mouth to feed to the other lions, and, seeing as she does not see that she fits in, leaves the pride and becomes a Wanderer. After a year with the Wanderers, Suki now has Dark's cubs but still refuses to hunt. One night Harry, who killed Fleck's mother, eats all but one of Suki's cubs, Rory. Harry claims they went missing and threatens for her last cub to "go missing" if she does not contribute. That night Suki overhears Harry talking to Dark about striking another attack on the pride saying they will kill them all. Outraged, Suki goes back to warn her pride about the impending attack.

On her way back, Suki meets Lush, a lion who left the pride to see the rest of the world. Suki asks him to help her find some food and help fight the Wanderers. She hunts for the first time to provide food for the pride as they had not eaten for a while. Since the pride will not accept Fleck, he decides to join the Wanderers. Soon a fight erupts on the mountain top containing Harry and Linus where Harry dies by falling off the cliff side after Dark refuses to help him because Dark had just found out what Harry did to his cubs. Both Fleck and Dark leave after the battle, with Fleck threatening his revenge, claiming he will come back with an entire group of "highly-trained lions." Suki mates with Lush and has his cubs as Linus decides to leave to see the rest of the world and vows to come back when he is needed.

Voice cast

Animals seen in the film 

 African lion
 White-backed vulture
 plains zebra
 blue wildebeest
 cape buffalo
 nile crocodile
 spitting cobra
 African bush elephant
 spotted hyena
 olive baboon
 warthog
 banded mongoose
 sable antelope
 black rhinoceros
 Marabou stork

External links 
 
 

2004 television films
2004 films
British television films
Films scored by George Fenton
Films set in Tanzania
Films shot in Tanzania